Bandwagon is a half-hour music program featuring traditional dance music, most notably polka, performed in front of a ballroom audience dancing along. The program is produced and broadcast by KEYC-TV in Mankato, Minnesota. The show has been aired November 21, 1960; the title Bandwagon was added on March 30, 1961. It is one of the longest-running televised music programs in the world.

In the past, the show was sponsored by John Deere, and aired as the John Deere Bandwagon; later it was sponsored by Randall's, a defunct Midwestern supermarket chain, and was titled as Randall's Bandwagon.

Earl Lamont was the original host of the program.  Chuck Pasek began hosting the program in 1967. Dick Ginn, who worked for Randall's and was involved in their sponsorship of the show since 1974, joined Pasek in hosting in the early 1990s. Following Chuck Pasek's retirement in 1995, Tom Goetzinger began co-hosting the program. Bandwagons current host is Tania Cordes, owner of the Kato Ballroom.

The format of the show is simple: the host introduces the band for the week, which performs a number of music selections. During each show, the second song is referenced as the roll-up selection, it features submitted birthday and anniversary announcements of viewers rolling-up over the screen.

The show formerly originated from KEYC's studio in North Mankato, Minnesota, and now is recorded at the Kato Ballroom in Mankato. In addition, in the past some episodes have been recorded on location, such as at Heritagefest, a former German heritage festival in New Ulm, Minnesota. Four half-hour episodes for the following month are usually recorded the first Monday of every month, and admission is $8.00 for three hours of entertainment.

Notes

External links
 Audio documentary about the program
 KEYC's page for program information on Bandwagon

1960 American television series debuts
1960s American music television series
1970s American music television series
1980s American music television series
1990s American music television series
2000s American music television series
2010s American music television series
2020s American music television series
Dance television shows
Local music television shows in the United States
Television in Minnesota
John Deere